Guanosine monophosphate (GMP), also known as 5′-guanidylic acid or guanylic acid (conjugate base guanylate), is a nucleotide that is used as a monomer in RNA. It is an ester of phosphoric acid with the nucleoside guanosine. GMP consists of the phosphate group, the pentose sugar ribose, and the nucleobase guanine; hence it is a ribonucleoside monophosphate. Guanosine monophosphate is commercially produced by microbial fermentation.

As an acyl substituent, it takes the form of the prefix guanylyl-.

De novo synthesis

GMP synthesis starts with D-ribose 5′-phosphate, a product of the pentose phosphate pathway. The synthesis proceeds by the gradual formation of the purine ring on carbon-1 of ribose, with CO2, glutamine, glycine, aspartate and one-carbon derivatives of tetrahydrofolate donating various elements towards the building of the ring
As inhibitor of guanosine monophosphate synthesis in experimental models, the glutamine analogue DON can be used.

cGMP

GMP can also exist as a cyclic structure known as cyclic GMP. Within certain cells the enzyme guanylyl cyclase makes cGMP from GTP.

cGMP plays an important role in mediating hormonal signaling.

Food additive 
Guanosine monophosphate is known as E number reference E626. In the form of its salts, such as disodium guanylate (E627), dipotassium guanylate (E628) and calcium guanylate (E629), are food additives used as flavor enhancers to provide the umami taste. It is often used in synergy with disodium inosinate; the combination is known as disodium 5′-ribonucleotides. Disodium guanylate is often found in instant noodles, potato chips and snacks, savoury rice, tinned vegetables, cured meats, and packet soup.

As it is a fairly expensive additive, it is usually not used independently of glutamic acid or monosodium glutamate (MSG), which also contribute umami.  If inosinate and guanylate salts are present in a list of ingredients but MSG does not appear to be, the glutamic acid is likely provided as part of another ingredient, such as a processed soy protein complex (hydrolyzed soy protein), autolyzed yeast, or soy sauce.

See also

References

Nucleotides
Flavor enhancers
Phosphate esters
Purines
E-number additives